The 2022 Championship League was a professional ranking snooker tournament that took place from 28 June to 29 July 2022 at the Morningside Arena in Leicester, England. The event featured 128 players and was played as three rounds of round-robin groups of four, before a best-of-five final. It was the 19th edition of the Championship League and the first ranking tournament of the 2022–23 snooker season. 

David Gilbert was the defending champion, having defeated Mark Allen 3–1 in the final of the previous ranking edition of the tournament. However, he was knocked out during the second group stage of this edition.

Luca Brecel won the tournament, defeating Lu Ning 3–1 to win his third ranking title and second Championship League title.

Tournament format
The 2022 Championship League took place from 28 June to 29 July 2022 at the Morningside Arena in Leicester, England.
128 players took part in the event. The competition began with 32 rounds of group matches with each group consisting of four players. Two groups were played to a finish every day during four blocks, from 28 June to 1 July, from 4 to 7 July, from 11 to 14 July, and from 18 to 21 July using a two-table setup in the arena. The groups were contested using a round-robin format, with six matches played in each group. All matches in group play were played as best of four frames, with three points awarded for a win and one point for a draw. Group positions were determined by points scored, frame difference and then head-to-head results between players who were tied. Places that were still tied were then determined by the highest  made in the group.

The 32 players that topped the group tables qualified for the group winners' stage, consisting of eight groups of four players. The eight winners from the group winners' stage qualified for the two final groups, with the final taking place later on the same day. The winner took the Championship League title and a place at the 2022 Champion of Champions.

Prize fund 
The breakdown of prize money for the tournament is shown below.

Stage One
Winner: £3,000
Runner-up: £2,000
Third place: £1,000
Fourth place: £0

Stage Two
Winner: £4,000
Runner-up: £3,000
Third place: £2,000
Fourth place: £1,000

Stage Three
Winner: £6,000
Runner-up: £4,000
Third place: £2,000
Fourth place: £1,000

Final
Winner: £20,000
Runner-up: £10,000

Tournament total: £328,000

Summary

Tournament draw

Stage One 
Stage One consisted of 32 groups, each containing four players.

Group 1 

Group 1 was played on 4 July.

Group 2 

Group 2 was played on 19 July.

Group 3 

Group 3 was played on 7 July.

Group 4 

Group 4 was played on 29 June.

Group 5 

Group 5 was played on 11 July.

Group 6 

Group 6 was played on 30 June.

Group 7 

Group 7 was played on 19 July.

Group 8 

Group 8 was played on 21 July.

Group 9 

Group 9 was played on 6 July.

Group 10 

Group 10 was played on 1 July.

Group 11 

Group 11 was played on 18 July.

Group 12 

Group 12 was played on 21 July.

Group 13 

Group 13 was played on 28 June.

Group 14 

Group 14 was played on 18 July.

Group 15 

Group 15 was played on 5 July.

Group 16 

Group 16 was played on 20 July.

Group 17 

Group 17 was played on 14 July.

Group 18 

Group 18 was played on 13 July.

Group 19 

Group 19 was played on 20 July.

Jimmy White withdrew from the group due to travel issues.

Group 20 

Group 20 was played on 13 July.

Group 21 

Group 21 was played on 12 July.

Group 22 

Group 22 was played on 12 July.

Group 23 

Group 23 was played on 7 July.

Group 24 

Group 24 was played on 28 June.

Group 25 

Group 25 was played on 14 July.

Group 26 

Group 26 was played on 30 June.

Group 27 

Group 27 was played on 4 July.

Group 28 

Group 28 was played on 11 July.

Group 29 

Group 29 was played on 1 July.

Group 30 

Group 30 was played on 6 July.

Group 31 

Group 31 was played on 29 June.

Group 32 

Group 32 was played on 5 July.

Stage Two 
Stage Two consisted of eight groups, each containing four players.

Group A 

Group A was played on 27 July.

Group B 

Group B was played on 28 July.

Group C 

Group C was played on 26 July.

Group D 

Group D was played on 27 July.

Group E 

Group E was played on 25 July.

Group F 

Group F was played on 25 July.

Group G 

Group G was played on 28 July.

Group H 

Group H was played on 26 July.

Stage Three 
Stage Three consisted of two groups, each containing four players.

Group 1 

Group 1 was played on 29 July.

Group 2 

Group 2 was played on 29 July.

Final

Century breaks 
A total of 106 century breaks were made during the tournament.

 145, 138, 125, 123, 105, 105, 101, 101  Zhao Xintong
 144, 112, 109, 103, 100  Shaun Murphy
 142, 104  Mark Allen
 141, 106  Matthew Selt
 140, 133  Mark Williams
 139, 135, 129  Lu Ning
 139, 108  Chris Wakelin
 138  David Lilley
 137, 136, 108, 107, 104  Pang Junxu
 136, 108  Chang Bingyu
 135, 132, 106  Zhou Yuelong
 135, 130, 106  Ricky Walden
 135  Lyu Haotian
 134, 130, 102  Jamie Jones
 133  Jak Jones
 133  Peng Yisong
 133  Jimmy Robertson
 131, 130, 108, 107  Michael White
 131, 120  Stuart Bingham
 131, 111  Ian Burns
 130, 116, 114, 106  Anthony Hamilton
 130  Jackson Page
 127, 121  Ronnie O'Sullivan
 127, 112, 111, 103, 103, 101  Xiao Guodong
 127, 100  Ben Woollaston
 125  Ryan Day
 125  Andy Lee
 124, 123, 117  Hossein Vafaei
 120, 101  Wu Yize
 118  Thepchaiya Un-Nooh
 117, 115, 111, 108, 100  Jordan Brown
 117  Ben Mertens
 117  Joe Perry
 115, 115  Gary Wilson
 114, 108, 100  Luca Brecel
 113  Louis Heathcote
 113  Mark Selby
 111, 100  Li Hang
 111  Joe O'Connor
 105, 102  Alexander Ursenbacher
 105  Barry Hawkins
 104  Cao Yupeng
 104  Mark Davis
 103  Dylan Emery
 103  Tian Pengfei
 102, 100  David Gilbert
 101  Aaron Hill
 101  Fraser Patrick
 100  Sanderson Lam
 100  Haydon Pinhey

References

External links 
 Matchroom Sport – Championship League Snooker

2022 (2)
2022 in snooker
2022 in English sport
June 2022 sports events in the United Kingdom
July 2022 sports events in the United Kingdom
2022 Championship League